Vettiyar is a village in the district of Alappuzha, in Kerala, India, on the Mavelikkara - Pandalam road. It lies on the banks of Achankovil river. It is situated between Mavelikkara and Pandalam.

Village life
Vettiyar consists of many green paddy fields, rubber plantations, cashew trees, coconut trees, betel leaves. It is a small village where urbanization are improving. Football is the most popular pastime of youths in the village.
VETTIYAR NERCHAPALLI CHANDANKUDAM NERCHA FAMOUS IN KERALA.THE FESTIVAL CONDUCT ON JANUARY 23-24 ON EVERY YEAR.

Pathamudayam is a festival conducted at Palliyarakkavu temple on 23 April and September 1 to 8.

Mosques
VETTIYAR KIZHAKK NERCHAPALLI (NAJATHUL ISLAM JHUMA MAJID)
HIDAYATHUL ISLAM JHUMA MASJID VETTIYAR

Temples 
 Palliyarakkavu Devi Temple (the village temple)
 Ramanalloor Sree Mahavishnu Temple
 Kandakalankavu Shiva Temple
 Kottalethu Temple
Mekkattusseril Durga Temple
 Parakulangara Devi Temple
 Moorthy Temple
 Sankaran Swamy Kuzhivila 
 Chattampi Swami-Kandakalankavu
 Tharayil Nagakshethram

Churches 
 Indian Pentecostal Church of God-Bethel
 Indian Pentecostal Church of God Salem
 St. Thomas Marthoma Church, Vettiyar
 New India Bible Church, Kottemala
 Pentecostal Maranatha Gospel Church
 Salom Marthoma Church
 Shalom CSI Church
 Sharon Fellowship Church 
 St. Mary's Malankara Catholic Church
 St. Mary's Orthodox Church
 St. Thomas Evangelical Church of India
 OPA-CESS Headquarters, Vettiyar

Schools
 Devi Vilasom Lower Primary School
 Edappon Higher Secondary School
 Janardhanan Memorial Ezhuthu Palli
 Mannam Memorial Lower Primary School
 Mohammaden Lower Primary School, Nalumukku
 T. M. Varghese Memorial High School
 Iratta Pallikkudam

References

Villages in Alappuzha district